The sociology of food is the study of food as it relates to the history, progression, and future development of society, encompassing its production, preparation, consumption, and distribution, its medical, ritual, spiritual, ethical and cultural applications, and related environmental and labor issues.

The aspect of food distribution in our society can be examined through the analysis of the changes in the food supply chain. Globalization in particular, has significant effects on the food supply chain by enabling scale effect in the food distribution industry.

Food distribution

Impact from scale effects 
Scale effects resulting from centralized acquisition purchase centres in the food supply chain favor large players such as big retailers or distributors in the food distribution market. This is due to the fact that they can utilize their strong market power and financial advantage over smaller players. Having both strong market power and greater access to the financial credit market meant that they can impose barriers to entry and cement their position in the food distribution market. This would result in a food distribution chain that is characterized by large players on one end and small players choosing niche markets to operate in on the other end. The existence of smaller players in specialized food distribution markets could be attributed to their shrinking market share and their inability to compete with the larger players due to the scale effects. Through this mechanism, globalization has displaced smaller role players.
Another mechanism troubling the specialized food distribution markets is the ability of distribution chains to possess their own brand. Stores with their own brand are able to combat price wars between competitors by lowering the price of their own brand, thus making consumers more likely to purchase goods from them.

Early history and culture
Since the beginning of mankind, food was important simply for the purpose of nourishment. As primates walked the Earth, they solely consumed food for a source of energy as they had to hunt and forage because food was not easily on hand. By early humans fending for themselves, they had figured out that they needed a high energy diet to keep going on a daily basis to survive.

These developments eventually lead to agriculture, which also goes into the labor for food and the economic part of the sociology of food. As the years went on, food become more and more of a way to bring cultures and people together. In many cultures, food is what brings people together. This carried for centuries. From the homo-sapiens hunting and gathering, to the colonists to the New World sharing a feast with the Native Americans (that has been revived as a tradition named Thanksgiving), to the popularization of restaurants/eating out in the last several decades and the togetherness that comes with eating; these developments now show communication and connectivity relating to food. According to sociologists, there are different groups of food that are divided up by their purpose and meaning. There are cultural super foods, which are the staples for a culture. There are prestige foods, which reflect economic status, and body image food which is mainly consumed for the betterment of the body. Sympathetic foods are eaten for an acclaimed desirable property, like a superstition.  Lastly, there are physiological foods, which are consumed for a specific health reason (like what a pregnant woman eats for a healthy pregnancy). These different categories help researchers and sociologists study culture in the perspective of food. It often shows how food grows, molds and changes with society. For example, if someone believes in homeopathy, that would fall under the sympathetic foods or physiologic foods. This is because they are consumed for their properties and beliefs of what it could do. Another example of one of these categories of foods would be caviar or oysters for the prestige foods, because they are often more expensive and those who consume it and purchase it do so to show their socioeconomic status, or SES.

Sociological perspectives 
Through the lens of a symbolic interactionist, there are many symbols that have to do with the sociology of food. Food, in many cultures, brings people together and connects them on multiple different levels. For example, the tradition of eating with the family around the table. It represents togetherness with one and another and communication. Food itself could symbolize something greater than what it is. In America, fast food could represent the busy family that needs a quick dinner to some. To others, however, it could display the “McDonaldization Theory” which centers around the idea of, specifically American, consumption. Another example of how the sociology of food can be symbolized would be making the food from scratch. This definitely goes along with the family. With other theories of sociology, conflict theory also pertains to the sociology of food. As mentioned before, food was first and foremost used for nourishment and means of survival. Due to this, that can fall under conflict theory. The roles of the hunter and gather meant that early humans had to fight and forage to survive. The conflict could also display the survival of the fittest, because there was a conflict for getting food and nourishment, the only the ones who were to best for prevail and provide nourishment for themselves and their families. This evolved to what it is today, with people having jobs to make a living for themselves, which goes into food and nourishment.

Psychology and disorders 
Eating disorders are symbolic of the sociology of food. They represent how much forced control (or the lack thereof) someone can have over themselves about something so essential for survival. Eating disorders do not limit themselves to Anorexia. These disorders include bulimia and Binge Eating Disorder (binge eating) as well. People with such disorders often use food as a reward. In other cases they see food as something to avoid, even though they need it for survival. The relationship that people share with their food is always varied and is a very complex topic. From a sociological standpoint, media has a lot to do with this. Not only does this have to with the sociology of food, but it has to do with how media represents society as a whole. Both men and women, (but majorly women)  see targeted and inaccurate representations of "the perfect body", leading them to want to have a body more like the one considered normal. In disorders like Anorexia Nervosa or Bulimia Nervosa/Bulimia, patients have an intense fear of gaining weight and consuming calories. These disorders go on to represent the damaged relationship people share with their food and their weight, and how it is always attached to negativity in popular media. Inaccurate representation leads people to focus more and more on their external appearance as opposed to them taking into consideration their absolute need for nourishment. 
The false image shown publicly of what a perfect body looks like and how it is affected by consuming as many calories as a person normally might, has led to Anorexia Nervosa being the mental health disorder with the highest mortality rate. Many people in society and the way society is developing have what is called body dysmorphia. Body dysmorphia disorder is a mental health condition where a person spends a lot of time worrying about flaws in their appearance. Body image has become a problem surrounding this topic as social media can show unrealistic standards related to eating issues/disorders and the sociology based on food consumption.

Dieting 

The fad of diets have been around for centuries, but the obsession with being thin and slim only really began trending in mainstream media in the 1990s, for example, through trends, such as heroin chic. Historically, if a woman was large and plump, it showed that she was getting taken care of. It showed her wealth because she could afford to eat, as opposed to a peasant who did not have the luxury to readily available meals. The desired woman was not stick thin. The notable change began in the 1920s era were the “boyish” figure became the most desired for a woman. Later, going into the 1960s, models like Twiggy made headlines about how thin she was, and many women strived to be like her body type. This carried on to the 1980s where dieting (like the South Beach Diet and Weight Watchers) grew in popularity, along with the popularization of working out and work out videos. This was the start of mainstream dieting fads. Among these, others like the Atkins diet, Jenny Craig, and paleo began to take popularity. As of early-mid-2010s, other diets became mainstream. This included vegetarianism, dairy-free, veganism, raw diets, and gluten-free. There are many reasons why someone would choose a certain type of diet: moral reasons, digestive issues, outside influence, or religious influence. The similarities and changes in the modern diet or communities and the effect of globalization on food production and supply. An important factor mentioned states, from the effect of globalization on food production and supply to evolving cultural responses to food – including cooking and eating practices, the management of consumer anxieties, and concerns over obesity and the medicalization of food – the first part examines how changing food practices have shaped and are shaped by wider social trends.

Obesity
The obesity epidemic that has spread across America also is a great example on how food shapes society and they way people live, along with the evolution of  the type of food Americans consume. Due to the busy manic lives that many Americans have, fast food and prepackaged foods with higher calories have gained popularity and have become mainstream in American consumption. The environment in which people with certain socioeconomic backgrounds live also heavily affect the type of food they consume. High calorie and low nutritional food tend to be less expensive and are easier to access. Thus, when shopping for food many lean towards the cheaper options. Lack of physical fitness is also a crucial aspect that is adding to the obesity epidemic. Studies have found that there is a direct correlation between walkability in neighborhoods and exercise. Also, if one's neighborhood does not have ready access to recreation activities they are at risk of becoming over weight and obesity. Going along with the subject of eating disorders, obesity could have to do with the feeling of lack of control that comes with over eating. There has been progress on combating America's obesity problem, with programs being put in place to help promote healthy eating and fitness. More and more restaurants are putting the amount of calories that are in the meals.  Also, many food companies such as Coca-Cola are promoting making healthy choices with their drinks and products, also putting the calories on them and making the nutrition facts readily available.

References 
 Beardsworth, Alan, and Keil, Teresa. Sociology on the Menu : An Invitation to the Study of Food and Society (1). London, US: Routledge, 2002. ProQuest ebrary. Web. 21 November 2016.
 Caplan, Pat, ed. Food, Health and Identity (1). London, US: Routledge, 2013. ProQuest ebrary. Web. 7 December 2016.
 Halkier, Bente. Consumption Challenged : Food in Medialised Everyday Lives. Farnham, GB: Routledge, 2010. ProQuest ebrary. Web. 7 December 2016.
 Institute of Medicine. Hunger and Obesity : Understanding a Food Insecurity Paradigm—Workshop Summary. Washington, US: National Academies Press, 2011. ProQuest ebrary. Web. 7 December 2016.
 Lupton, Deborah. Food, the Body and the Self. London, GB: SAGE Publications Ltd, 1996. ProQuest ebrary. Web. 21 November 2016.
 Marsden, Terry, and Cavalcanti, Josefa Salete Barbosa, eds. Research in Rural Sociology and Development : Labor Relations in Globalized Food. Bingley, GB: Emerald Group Publishing Limited, 2014. ProQuest ebrary. Web. 21 November 2016.
 Ritzer, George. Explorations in the Sociology of Consumption : Fast Food, Credit Cards and Casinos. London, GB: SAGE Publications Ltd, 2001. ProQuest ebrary. Web. 21 November 2016.

See also 

 Food studies
 Food industry
 Index of sociology of food articles

Further reading
 Carolan, M. 2012, The sociology of food and agriculture, Routledge, New York;London;.
 Beardsworth, Alan & Keil Teresa. 1997, Sociology on the Menu: An Invitation to the Study of Food and Society, Routledge, 
 Germov, John. 2004. A Sociology of Food & Nutrition: The Social Appetite, Oxford University Press, 
 Kingsolver, Barbara. 2007. Animal, Vegetable, Miracle: A Year of Food Life, Harpercollins, 
 Levenstein, Harvey. 1988, Revolution at the Table: The Transformation of the American Diet, Oxford University Press, 
 McIntosh Alex, 1996, Sociologies of Food and Nutrition. Environment, Development, and Public Policy, Springer, 
 Nestle, Marion. 2003, Food Politics: How the Food Industry Influences Nutrition and Health, Univ of California Press, 
 Mennell, Stephen. 1993. The Sociology of Food: Eating, Diet and Culture, SAGE Publications, 
 Poulain, Jean Pierre, 2017, The Sociology of Food: Eating and the Place of Food in Society, Bloomsbury,
 Ritzer, George. 2007, The McDonaldization of Society, SAGE Publications, 
 Schlosser, Eric. 2001. Fast Food Nation: The Dark Side of the All American Meal, HarperCollins

References

External links
 Research Center for the History of Food and Drink.
 The Food Timeline
 World of Food Science

 
Food science
Sociology